Michael Martin Gilday (born October 10, 1962) is a United States Navy officer who has served as the 32nd chief of naval operations since August 22, 2019. Gilday has commanded two destroyers, served as Director of the Joint Staff, commanded the Tenth Fleet/Fleet Cyber Command, and led Carrier Strike Group 8.

Early life and education

Gilday was born in Lowell, Massachusetts, and is a 1985 graduate of the United States Naval Academy as a Surface Warfare Officer. He has also graduated with masters degrees from the Harvard Kennedy School and the National War College.

Career

He also had staff assignments on the Bureau of Naval Personnel, Chief of Naval Operation (Strategic Plans and Policy Directorate) and staff to the vice chief of naval operations. His joint assignments include Naval Aide to the President and executive assistant to the chairman of the Joint Chiefs of Staff. Gilday was awarded the Navy Commendation Medal with Valor for his actions aboard Princeton when the ship was damaged by an Iraqi mine during the Persian Gulf War.

As a flag officer, Gilday served as Director of Operations for NATO's Joint Force Command in Lisbon and Director of Operations for United States Cyber Command. He assumed the duties of Commander, Fleet Cyber Command and United States Tenth Fleet on July 14, 2016, was appointed Director of Operations for the Joint Chiefs of Staff in May 2018, and became Director of the Joint Staff from March 1, 2019.

On July 11, 2019, Gilday was nominated for appointment as the next chief of naval operations (CNO). On August 1, the United States Senate voted unanimously to award Gilday a fourth star following the Senate Armed Services Committee's recommendation that he succeed Admiral John M. Richardson as CNO in September 2019.

On April 15, 2020, Gilday announced the Navy was considering reinstating Brett Crozier, earlier fired in relation to his controversial response to coronavirus disease on the aircraft carrier . Gilday and the acting United States Secretary of the Navy, James E. McPherson, recommended that Crozier be reinstated as captain of the Roosevelt on April 25, 2020.

On August 10, 2020, Gilday was running on the Washington Navy Yard base, where he lives, when he "fell ill". Gilday was assisted by a passing Marine, and was taken to his physician. He underwent heart surgery for a pre-existing condition about two weeks later. He returned to work full-time on September 28.

Awards and decorations

References

External links

Response to the fire aboard the 

|-

United States Navy personnel of the Gulf War
Harvard Kennedy School alumni
Living people
National War College alumni
Military personnel from Massachusetts
Recipients of the Defense Superior Service Medal
Recipients of the Legion of Merit
Recipients of the Navy Distinguished Service Medal
United States Naval Academy alumni
United States Navy admirals
1962 births
People from Lowell, Massachusetts
Chiefs of Naval Operations